The Cambodian film industry advances mainly while Legendary films remain the consumers favourite genre. Of the 20 films listed, 4 films are in existence, 4 have been remade, and 12 have not yet been remade:

References 
 

1968
Films
Cambodian